The Pashtunkhwa Milli Awami Party, abbreviated as PMAP or PKMAP, is a political party in Pakistan's Balochistan province. It was founded by Mahmood Khan Achakzai, who was elected as the chairman, and Sher Ali Bacha, who served as the General Secretary, in March 1989 in Quetta.

The party was a coalition partner of the PML-N in the Balochistan government following the 2013 elections and stood by the pmln during some of the latter's most challenging times in government.

Ideology
PkMAP has opposed the merger of Federally Administered Tribal Areas with Khyber Pakhtunkhwa province and has been widely criticized for the position. Its chief Mehmood Khan Achakzai has previously suggested that FATA should be governed either by a governor or a council that should be elected through adult franchise. PkMAP chief Achakzai has also called for the creation of a province for Pakhtuns living in areas from the Pak-Afghan border to Mianwali in Pakistan.

Electoral history
In 2018 polls the party could not secure a single seat in the national assembly including the loss of the seat of its leader and was able to win one seat in the Balochistan assembly. In the 2013 Pakistan general and provincial elections, the party won three general seats in the National Assembly and 10 in the Balochistan Assembly. In 2002, PkMAP secured one NA seat and three provincial assembly seats. The party won two provincial seats in the 1997 polls. It won three NA seats and four provincial seats in 1993. Prior to this, in the 1990 elections, PkMAP won three provincial assembly seats.

References

External links

Political parties in Pakistan